Bambi is the title character in Felix Salten's 1923 novel, Bambi, a Life in the Woods, and its sequel, Bambi's Children, as well as the Disney animated films Bambi and Bambi II. The character also appears in Salten's novels Perri and Fifteen Rabbits.

Early German-language editions of the novels were illustrated by Hans Bertle. In the films, Bambi's species was changed from a roe deer to a white-tailed deer, which would be more familiar to American audiences. His image is a Disney icon, comparable to the recognition of Jiminy Cricket or Tinkerbell, and he is even shown on Disney stock certificates. He appears as a summon in the video game Kingdom Hearts, and is a playable character in Disney Magic Kingdoms. He is one of the guests in the animated television series House of Mouse. He also makes cameos in No Hunting (1955), Who Framed Roger Rabbit (1988), The Lion King 1½ (2004), and Chip 'n Dale: Rescue Rangers (2022).

Disney film appearances

Bambi 

In the first film, Bambi is not very strongly personalized to strengthen the environmental perspective of the film. Bambi, as with most of his friends, could be any deer in any forest.  In his early youth, Bambi has wide eyes, spindly legs, a curious nature and high-pitched voice.  As he grows, he gradually becomes more mature, but even in young adulthood, he seems a very young buck with a delicate build and a fairly naïve nature.

The naturalistic animation in the first film was helped by a pair of four-month-old fawns sent to the studio by Maine game wardens. However, human models were also used for one scene: actress Jane Randolph and Ice Capades star Donna Atwood acted as live-action references for the scene where Bambi and Thumper are on ice.  Disney also had Rico LeBrun, a painter of animals, come to the studio to lecture on the structure and movement of animals.  Nature photographer Maurice Day spent months in a forest in Maine, recording animals for the animators, as well.

Bambi II 

In Bambi II, Bambi is much more distinctly personalized. In this film which fills in the gap between the death of his mother and when he was next shown as a young adult, Bambi finds himself faced with a number of challenges.  First, there is the death of his mother and his consequential move to live with his father, the Great Prince of the Forest.  His father is reluctant to learn to be a father.  In addition, Bambi begins to fall in love with Faline, and comes into conflict with an older fawn called Ronno (the same deer he would later fight over Faline with as a young adult). Whereas in the first film he follows life wherever it led him, in this film he is more assertive in order to bond with and impress his father.  In the first film, Bambi's status as the young prince had little impact on the flow of the story.  In this film, his rank becomes a key part of the storyline as he sets out to prove to himself and others, most of all his father, demonstrating that he deserves to be prince and can live up to his father's name.

References

External links
 Bambi at Disney Archives

Bambi characters
Fictional deer and moose
Fictional princes
Fictional kings
Literary characters introduced in 1923
Child characters in animated films
Male characters in animation
Male characters in literature
Male characters in film